Wingate railway station is a suburban railway station in Lower Hutt, New Zealand, serving the Wingate industrial area and parts of Avalon, New Zealand, Naenae and Taitā suburbs. The station is served by Metlink's electric multiple unit trains of the "Matangi" FP class. Trains stopping at Wingate run to Wellington, Taitā and Upper Hutt.

The station has an island platform station between double tracks, linked via ramp south to the Wingate Overbridge and via an overbridge north to Rainey Grove (west) and Wingate Crescent (east).

History 
The then Hutt Valley Branch to Waterloo opened on 26 May 1927. The branch line was extended to Epuni and Naenae on 7 January 1946 and to Taitā (then known as Taita) on 14 April 1947. Double track was to Naenae only.

The Wingate Station was opened on 25 September 1950. Double track was extended to Wingate and Taitā on 22 February 1953. With the opening of the section to Haywards (now called Manor Park) from 1 March 1954 and the closing of the Melling-Haywards section, this route became the main route to Upper Hutt and the Wairarapa.

Services 
The following Metlink bus routes serve Wingate station:

References

External links
 Passenger service timetables from Metlink

Rail transport in Wellington
Buildings and structures in Lower Hutt
Railway stations in New Zealand
Railway stations opened in 1950
1950 establishments in New Zealand